This is a list of notable women writers of electronic literature.

A
Annie Abrahams (born 1954), Dutch performance artist and writer, pioneering collective writing experiments
Mabel Addis (1912–2004), American writer, teacher and game designer
Anna Anthropy (fl 2010),  American video game designer and interactive fiction author
Kate Armstrong (fl 2000s), Canadian multimedia artist, experimental writer and curator

B
Amaranth Borsuk (born 1981), American poet experimenting with digital poetry
Mez Breeze (fl 1990s), Australian artist practicing digital poetry and electronic literature
Amy Briggs (born 1962), American video game developer involved in interactive fiction
Jennifer Brozek (born 1970), American author and game design writer
Nancy Buchanan (born 1946), American artist involved in digital performance art and fictional narrative

C
J.R. Carpenter (born 1972), Canadian-British artist and writer active in digital literature
Lynda Clark (born 1981), British author, creator of interactive fiction

D
Caterina Davinio (born 1957), Italian poet, novelist and new media artist
Adriana de Barros (born 1976), Portuguese-Canadian illustrator, creator of interactive narratives and poems
Claire Dinsmore (born 1961), American jeweller, designer and new media artist

E
Astrid Ensslin (fl 2000s), German digital humanities scholar active in digital fiction and video games
Tina Escaja (born 1965), Spanish-American writer and digital artist

F
Mary Flanagan (fl 2000s), American game designer

G
Belén Gache (born 1960), Spanish-Argentinian novelist and experimental writer
Samantha Gorman (fl 2010), American game developer employing touchscreen narratives
Dene Grigar (fl 2000), American multimedia artist, former president of the Electronic Literature Organization

H
Amira Hanafi (born 1979), American/Egyptian artist and poet active in electronic literature
N. Katherine Hayles (born 1943), American literary critic and academic active in electronic literature
Porpentine Charity Heartscape (born 1987), video game designer involving hypertext and interactive fiction
Amy Hennig (born 1964), American video game developer and script writer

J
Shelley Jackson (born 1963), American experimental writer and artist

K
Alison Knowles (born 1933), American installation artist using visual, aural and tactile elements

L
Deena Larsen (born 1964), American new media and hypertext author
Olia Lialina (born 1971), Russian internet artist and experimental film critic
Christine Love (born 1989), Canadian novelist, interactive fiction writer and video game developer
Marjorie Luesebrink (born 1943), American author of hypertext fiction

M
Judy Malloy (born 1942), poet employing hypernarrative and information art
Cathy Marshall (fl 1990s), collaborative hypertext researcher and developer
Kathleen McConnell (fl 2000s), Canadian poet
María Mencía (fl 1999), Spanish-born media artist active in electronic literature

P
Allison Parrish (fl 2000s), American poet, games designer and creator of poetry bots
Judith Pintar (fl 1980s), sociologist, harp player and author of interactive fiction
Jessica Pressman (fl 2010), American academic and author involved in electronic literature, digital poetry and media
Kate Pullinger (born 1961), Canadian novelist and academic, author of digital fiction

Q
Alissa Quart (born 1972), American writer, poet and multimedia author

R
Jean Rabe (fl 1970s), Canadian journalist, novelist and game writer
Melinda Rackham (fl 1980s), Australian writer, digital artist and curator
Margaret Rhee (fl 2011), American new media artist with an interest in digital participatory action

S
Emily Short (fl 2000s), American interactive fiction writer
Lisa Smedman (fl 1997), Canadian writer of science fiction and gaming adventure novels
Sarah Smith (born 1947), American author and hypertext novelist
Stephanie Strickland (born 1942), American poet, author of digital poems

U
Camille Utterback (born 1970), American interactive installation artist

W
Adrianne Wortzel (born 1941), American artist using robotics in her works
Christine Wilks (born 1960), British award-winning digital writer and artist

Z
Jody Zellen (born 1961), American digital artist and art critic

References

 
 
Electronic
Electronic